Renauldia lycopodioides is a species of moss in the family Pterobryaceae. It is endemic to Tanzania, where it is known from only two locations and is considered an endangered species. It grows on tree branches in forested habitat. It is threatened by deforestation.

References

Hypnales
Endemic flora of Tanzania
Endangered plants
Taxonomy articles created by Polbot